Charlemagne Masséna Péralte (10 October 1886 – 1 November 1919) was a Haitian nationalist leader who opposed the United States occupation of Haiti in 1915. Leading guerrilla fighters called the Cacos, he posed such a challenge to the US forces in Haiti that the occupying forces had to upgrade their presence in the country; he was eventually killed by American troops. Péralte remains a highly praised hero in Haiti.

Early life
Péralte was born on 10 October 1886 in the city of Hinche. His father was General Remi Massena Peralte. His sister was the second wife of President of Haiti Oreste Zamor.

Guerrilla resistance
An officer by career, Charlemagne Péralte was the military chief of the city of Léogâne when the US Marines invaded Haiti in July 1915.

Refusing to surrender to foreign troops without fighting, Péralte resigned from his position and returned to his native town of Hinche to take care of his family's land. In 1917, he was arrested for a botched raid on the Hinche gendarmerie payroll, and was sentenced to five years of forced labor. Escaping his captivity, Charlemagne Péralte gathered a group of nationalist rebels and started guerrilla warfare against the US troops.

The troops led by Péralte were called "Cacos", a name that harked back to rural troops that historically took part in the political turmoil of late 19th century Haiti. The guerrilla warriors of the Cacos were such strong adversaries that the United States upgraded the US Marine contingent in Haiti and even employed airplanes for counter-guerrilla warfare. His forces attacked Port-au-Prince in 1919, but were driven off.

Death and aftermath

After two years of guerrilla warfare, leading Péralte to declare a provisional government in the north of Haiti, Charlemagne Péralte was betrayed by one of his officers, Jean-Baptiste Conzé, who led disguised US Marines Sergeant Herman H. Hanneken (later meritoriously promoted to Second Lieutenant for his exploits) and Corporal William Button into the rebels camp, near Grande-Rivière-du-Nord.

Péralte was shot in the heart at close range. Hanneken and his men then fled with Peralte's body strapped onto a mule.

In order to discourage rebel support from the Haitian population, the US troops took a picture of Charlemagne Péralte's body tied to a door, and distributed it in the country. However, it had the opposite effect, with the image's resemblance to a crucifixion making it an icon of the resistance and establishing Péralte as a martyr.

Charlemagne Péralte's remains were unearthed after the end of the US occupation in 1935.  A national funeral, attended by the then-President of Haiti, Sténio Vincent, was held in Cap-Haïtien, where his grave can still be seen today.

A portrait of Charlemagne Péralte can now be seen on the Haitian coins issued by the government of Jean-Bertrand Aristide after his 1994 return under the protection of US troops.

Consequently, for their daring exploit, Corporal Button (1895–1921) and Sergeant Hanneken (1893–1986) were both awarded the Medal of Honor for killing the "supreme bandit of Haiti". Hanneken later served in World War II, notably at Guadalcanal and ended his career as a brigadier general. In his later days, he constantly declined to comment on his exploits in Haiti, notably to Haitian journalists asking for interviews on the 100th anniversary of Péralte's birth, in 1986.

References 

1880s births
1919 deaths
Haitian nationalists
Haitian rebels
Haitian people of Mulatto descent
People from Hinche
Deaths by firearm in Haiti
Guerrillas killed in action
Haitian independence activists
People of the Banana Wars